Jacques Bangou (born October 27, 1950) is a Guadeloupean politician.

He was the mayor of Pointe-à-Pitre (2008 to 2019), Guadeloupe's main city.

2009 Guadeloupe Riots
Bangou was mayor in February 2009, when riots engulfed Pointe-à-Pitre during the 2009 French Caribbean general strikes on Guadeloupe.

He was a leading critic of the French government's response to the crisis.  He condemned French President Nicolas Sarkozy at one point during the strike and riots saying, "I call on the president to come out of his ivory tower, and finally tell us if France still cares about Guadeloupe."

References 

1950 births
Mayors of places in Guadeloupe
Living people
French people of Indian descent